Emery Harold Hallows (April 20, 1904September 11, 1974) was an American attorney and jurist who served as the 20th Chief Justice of the Wisconsin Supreme Court, from January 1968 until his resignation in August 1974.

Biography

Born in Fond du Lac, Wisconsin, Hallows graduated from Marquette University and received his J.D. degree from the University of Chicago Law School.  Hallows practiced law in Milwaukee, Wisconsin, and taught at the Marquette University Law School. In 1958, Hallows was appointed to the Wisconsin Supreme Court and became chief justice of the court in 1968 serving until his retirement in 1974.

Hallows authored the Court's opinion in the influential case Breunig v. American Family Insurance Company, which established the rule that a sudden mental incapacity, of which the defendant had no foreknowledge, was an adequate defense to tort liability. This rule is often known as the Breunig exception.

Personal life and family
Hallows met his wife, Mary Vivian Hurley, while they were both students at Marquette University.  They married February 15, 1930, at St. Catherine's Church in Milwaukee. They had at least two children together.  Mary died in April 1973 after a long illness, stemming from a series of strokes. Judge Hallows announced a short time later that he was being treated for leukemia.  He died on September 11, 1974, just a month after retiring from the Court.

References

External links
 Former justices - Justice E. Harold Hallows at Wisconsin Court System
 Hallows, E. Harold 1904 at Wisconsin Historical Society

Politicians from Fond du Lac, Wisconsin
Lawyers from Milwaukee
Marquette University alumni
University of Chicago Law School alumni
Marquette University faculty
Chief Justices of the Wisconsin Supreme Court
1904 births
1974 deaths
20th-century American judges
20th-century American lawyers